Jose Antonio "Tony" Casals Leviste (born January 16, 1940) is a Filipino politician and businessman, who served as Governor of Batangas from 1972 to 1980. Born to a distinguished Batangueño family renowned in both business and politics, he was married to Senator Loren Legarda, separated from her before the 2004 election campaign. The be-medalled Asian Games equestrienne Toni Leviste is his daughter from a previous marriage.

Leviste was sentenced to six years in prison for the murder of his long-time aide, Rafael de las Alas. Leviste served his sentence at the National Bilibid Prison in Muntinlupa and on December 6, 2013, he was released after his parole was granted.

Career 
Leviste graduated from the Lyceum of the Philippines in 1959 and became the president of the Student Varsitarian, a reputable campus organization for students hails from different provinces. During his term as Governor of Batangas, he was elected member of the Batasang Bayan chairman of the Regional Development Council, Vice President of the League of Governors and City Mayors, and chairman of the Program for Forest Ecosystem management.

Leviste was an advocate of the environment. He initiated a forest ecosystem management program which today continues to be a model in reforestation that made him earn the coveted "Ten Outstanding Young Men of the Philippines" (TOYM) award for Public Administration.

Leviste was chosen the "Realtor of the Year" by the Business Writers Association of the Philippines and served as the director in various government agencies, including the People's Homesite and Housing Corporation (now the NHA), Philippine Ports Authority, Philippine Aerospace Development Corporation, Semirara Mining Corporation and the Philippine Tourism Authority. He was co-founder of the Pasay Board of Realtors and the Philippine Association of Real Estate Boards. He also served as Chairman of the Philippine Leisure and Retirement Authority (now the PRA). He holds the rank of Lt. Commander in the Philippine Navy Reserve Force and is the Honorary Consul General of the State of Palestine.

Currently, he is the charter president of the Resort Association of the Philippines and co-founder of the Tourism Council of the Philippines.  He is the chief executive officer of the Leviste Group of Companies, a real estate firm engaged in housing, subdivision, condominium and resort development.

Conviction 
On January 14, 2009, Leviste was convicted of homicide in the killing of his longtime friend and aide Rafael de las Alas. Leviste had admitted responsibility for de las Alas' death, claiming he only fired in self-defence. The Makati Regional Trial Court sentenced him to six to twelve years in prison. Leviste served his sentence at the National Bilibid Prison in Muntinlupa.

Release from imprisonment
On December 6, 2013, Leviste was released after six years in prison after his parole has been granted.

References

1940 births
Living people
Governors of Batangas
20th-century Filipino businesspeople
20th-century Filipino lawyers
People from Batangas
Philippine Air Force personnel
Tagalog people
Lakas–CMD (1991) politicians
Kilusang Bagong Lipunan politicians
People's Reform Party politicians
Converts to Islam
Filipino Muslims
Lyceum of the Philippines University alumni
Filipinos convicted of murder
Politicians convicted of murder
21st-century Filipino businesspeople